Tchumbuli is a Guang language spoken by 2,000 to 3,000 people in Benin.

References

Guang languages
Languages of Benin